Gobiopterus birtwistlei is a species of goby belonging to the genus Gobiopterus. It is endemic to Singapore in the Western Pacific Ocean. According to Fishbase, it is currently the only described species of freshwater fish endemic to Singapore and is one of two described species of fish endemic to Singapore. It is demersal.

References

caudalis
Fish of the Pacific Ocean
Fish described in 1935
Taxa named by Albert William Herre